Créativité et Développement or C&D (English: Creativity and Development) was a French animation production company founded in 1987 by Jean Chalopin. In March 1996, Chalopin sold his company to Fox Kids Worldwide with library absorbed into Saban International Paris (later renamed SIP Animation in 2002) and later folded into The Walt Disney Company France in 2009.

Productions & Co-Productions

Television series

TV specials

References

External links 
 https://www.imdb.com/search/title/?companies=co0057440
https://www.imdb.com/title/tt10948356/
https://www.imdb.com/title/tt4299600/

French animation studios
French companies established in 1987
French companies disestablished in 1998
Saban Entertainment
1996 mergers and acquisitions
Television production companies of France
The Walt Disney Company subsidiaries
Disney acquisitions